The 1998 Turkish Super Cup match was a football match between the Turkish Super League champion, Galatasaray SK, and the Turkish Cup winner, Beşiktaş JK.
It was the last match under the name Presidential Cup and the last match between the Turkish Super League champion and the Turkish Cup winner till 2005.

Match details

Turkish Super Cup
1997–98 in Turkish football
Presidential Cup 1998
Presidential Cup 1998